Asaphodes albalineata is a species of moth in the family Geometridae. It is endemic to New Zealand and has been observed on Stewart Island / Rakiura. This species is similar in appearance to Asaphodes oraria but can be distinguished as it has an unusual pattern on the underside of its hindwings. It inhabits open hill tops and adults are on the wing in December.

Taxonomy
A. albalineata was first described by Alfred Philpott in 1915 under the name Xanthorhoe albalineata from a specimen collected in December, at an altitude of 600 metres, on Table Hill on Stewart Island / Rakiura.  In 1928 George Hudson discussed and illustrated this species under the name Xanthorhoe albilineata. In 1939 Louis Beethoven Prout placed this species in the genus Larentia. This placement was not accepted by New Zealand taxonomists. In 1971 J. S. Dugdale placed this species within the genus Asaphodes. In 1988 J. S. Dugdale reaffirmed this placement and stated that although both the original spelling of albalineata, as well as the correction albilineata in a revision by Edward Meyrick, are incorrect, albalineata should be used under ICNZ rules. The male holotype specimen is held in the New Zealand Arthropod Collection.

Description

Philpott originally described this species as follows:

This species is similar in appearance to Asaphodes oraria but can be distinguished from that species by the unusual pattern on the underside of its hindwings.

Distribution 
This species is endemic to New Zealand and has been observed on Stewart Island / Rakiura.

Habitat 
This species inhabits open hill tops.

Behaviour 
The adults of this species are on the wing in December.

References

Moths described in 1915
Moths of New Zealand
Larentiinae
Endemic fauna of New Zealand
Taxa named by Alfred Philpott
Endemic moths of New Zealand